Events from 2023 in Tuvalu.

Incumbents 
 Monarch: Charles III 
 Governor-General: Sir Tofiga Vaevalu Falani 
 Prime Minister: Kausea Natano

Events 
2023 Tuvaluan general election

Ongoing – COVID-19 pandemic in Oceania; COVID-19 pandemic in Tuvalu

Deaths

References 

2023 in Tuvalu
Tuvalu
Tuvalu
2020s in Tuvalu